Mirjana Kostić (born 6 August 1983), professionally known as Mika K., is a Serbian singer and musician, who came to media attention as a contestant of talents show Operacija trijumf.

Personal life 
Kostić graduated from the musical High School in Subotica and won full scholarship for Berklee College of Music in Boston twice. She has two older sisters. One of them, Gordana, is an opera singer, who currently lives and works in London.

Kostić admires Beyoncé Knowles, Alicia Keys, Anastacia, Lauryn Hill, Toše Proeski, and Dino Dvornik. She stated she was currently single. Kostić is fluent in Serbian, English, and Hungarian.

Career

Operacija trijumf
Before the Operacija trijumf, Kostić had a few television appearances on the B92. In 2008, she reached the regional fame as a student of Operacija trijumf, Balkan version of Endemol's Fame Academy. At the opening gala event, she performed "Molitva", the Eurovision Song Contest 2007 winning song of Marija Šerifović, with another student Milica Radošević and Šerifović herself. After series of additional competitions, broadcast on Operacija trijumf special show, the audience decided to give Kostić and Macedonian Kristijan Jovanov a second chance.

Kostić and Jovanov entered the academy after the fifth gala event. The sixth gala was her first performance as a student. She sang En Vogue's hit single "Free Your Mind" with Sonja Bakić. However, all students were nominated and Kostić and Jovanov, as the students least known to the audience, left the academy after the seventh gala. She performed "Kofer ljubavi" of famous Macedonian singer Kaliopi with Kaliopi herself.

When she was nominated, Kostić cried and said that she did not want to leave the academy and she and Jovanov are not responsible for the things that had happened earlier at the academy. She later said that "this is injustice", and that she feels sorry because the audience could not meet her better.

During the show, she performed the following songs:

 Marija Šerifović – "Molitva" with the student Milica Radošević and Marija Šerifović (Gala 1)
 En Vogue – "Free Your Mind" with the student Sonja Bakić (Gala 6)
 Kaliopi – "Kofer ljubavi" with Kaliopi (Gala 7)

Studio career
After her performance with Kostić on the Operacija trijumf, famous Macedonian singer Kaliopi stated she is preparing a song for Kostić because she is impressed by her voice. She also said that Kostić was her favourite on that show. After the show, Kostić took professional nickname "Mika K.".

Sky Wikluh, popular Serbian composer and rap musician, wrote a song for her, named "Moja noć", with production done by Gru. This song was one of the reserves for the Beovizija 2009, if someone of twenty contestants decided not to take part in. Kostić also sang as backing vocal for Regina's song "Bistra voda", which represented Bosnia and Herzegovina in the Eurovision Song Contest 2009. On 1 July 2009 Kostić performed "Bože pravde", the anthem of Serbia, alongside two more singers at the opening ceremony of 2009 Summer Universiade, which was held in Belgrade. She also performed "Bože pravde" at the closing ceremony of the 2009 Summer Universiade, and at the public reception of Serbian champions from the 2009 World Aquatics Championships. In August 2009, Kostić performed as a revival artist at the music festival in Ohrid, performing "Moja noć" and her new single "Daj mi sve", which features Sky Wikluh as a supporting artist.

Kostić is currently working on her debut album, which will be produced by Sky Wikluh, and will include collaborations with several eminent musicians worldwide, such as Greek pop star Anna Vissi. She announced recording songs in Serbian, English and even Hungarian.

Discography

Singles

Awards and nominations

References

External links 
 Official Website
 Mika Kostić at the ffficial website of Operacija trijumf

1983 births
Living people
People from Kanjiža
21st-century Serbian women singers
Serbian pop singers
Serbian television personalities
Sopranos
Indexi Award winners